Nuclear factor, interleukin 3 regulated, also known as NFIL3 or E4BP4 is a protein which in humans is encoded by the NFIL3 gene.

Function 

Expression of interleukin-3 (IL-3) is restricted to activated T cells, natural killer (NK) cells, and mast cell lines. Transcription initiation depends on the activating capacity of specific protein factors, such as NFIL3, that bind to regulatory regions of the gene, usually upstream of the transcription start site.

References

Further reading 

 
 
 
 
 
 
 
 

Transcription factors